Paulo Reyes Garcia is a New Zealand politician and former Member of Parliament in the House of Representatives for the New Zealand National Party.

Early life and career
Garcia was born in the city of San Juan, part of the conurbation of Metropolitan Manila, Philippines in 1965. He is a graduate of the University of the Philippines, and also attended the Academy of American and International Law in Texas in the United States of America. He was a barrister before entering parliament. In the Philippines, where he practised for ten years, his focus was commercial law, particularly as it applied to foreign and multinational companies operating in that country. After moving to New Zealand, he practised immigration law with a focus on investor migration. After initially working for McLeod & Associates and Corban Revell Lawyers, he established his own firm, Garcia Law.

Paulo Garcia was appointed honorary consul of the Philippines in Auckland in 2012, and was also involved in establishing the New Zealand Philippines Business Council.

Political career

Member of Parliament

In the  Garcia stood for National in the  electorate and was placed 50 on their party list. He came second to Deborah Russell with 38.55% of the vote and was not ranked high enough on National's party list to be allocated a seat in Parliament.

In February 2018 Garcia and several other "next in line" list candidates attended National's parliamentary caucus meeting to help ease their transition into parliament should they enter during the course of the parliamentary term. Garcia later entered Parliament in 2019 upon the resignation of National MP Nuk Korako. He was declared elected on 16 May 2019. He became New Zealand's first MP of Filipino descent. In 2020 he was briefly Deputy Chairperson of the Parliamentary committee on Foreign Affairs, Defense and Trade.

In February 2020 the National Party board decided that Garcia would be a list-only candidate in the 2020 general election.
During the 2020 election, Garcia lost his seat in Parliament.

References

Living people
Filipino emigrants to New Zealand
University of the Philippines alumni
New Zealand National Party MPs
Members of the New Zealand House of Representatives
New Zealand list MPs
Unsuccessful candidates in the 2017 New Zealand general election
Unsuccessful candidates in the 2020 New Zealand general election
Year of birth missing (living people)